Events from the 12th century in Canada.

Events 
 1142 - The Iroquois Confederacy (also known as the League of Peace and Power) was formed.

See also

List of North American settlements by year of foundation
History of Canada
Timeline of Canada history
List of years in Canada

References

 
Centuries in Canada